The Jamaica women's cricket team is the women's representative cricket team of the country of Jamaica. They compete in the Women's Super50 Cup and the Twenty20 Blaze. 

In 1973, they competed in the first World Cup, finishing sixth with one win. Since, the West Indies have competed as a united team, and Jamaica have only competed at domestic level.

History
Jamaica's first recorded match took place in 1967, and in their early history they played often against Trinidad, as well against a touring England side. 

In 1973, Jamaica competed in the inaugural World Cup. The side finished sixth in the group of seven, with one win, one no result and four losses. Their one victory came against Young England, helped by 61 from Vivalyn Latty-Scott and 4/9 from 6 overs from Madge Stewart.

The West Indies domestic system began in the 1975–76 season, with Jamaica competing in the Caribbean Women's Cricket Federation Championships. The full results and standings are not recorded, but Jamaica recorded one victory, by an innings and 29 runs against Grenada. The following season, 1977, Jamaica became the first recorded winners of a West Indian domestic competition, topping the Federation Championship table, with three drawn matches won on first innings score.

Jamaica are recorded as finishing runners-up in the premier domestic competition three more times over the next 20 years, in 1989, 1990 and 1992. Jamaica won their second title in 1999, beating Saint Lucia in the final of the knockout section of the Federation Championships by 4 wickets, helped by 93 from Marlene Needham.

Jamaica's most successful era came between 2011 and 2014, where they won five titles. They won the 50-over competition, now named the Regional Women's Championship, three times in a row, in 2011, 2013 and 2014, beating Trinidad and Tobago in the final in the first two years and beating Guyana in the final in 2014. Jamaica also won the first two T20 competitions in 2012 and 2013, beating Trinidad and Tobago in the final in 2012, with their captain Stafanie Taylor being named Player of the Tournament, and beating Barbados in the final in 2013.

Between 2015 and 2019, Jamaica finished as runners-up four times: in 2015 in the 50-over competition, and in three consecutive T20 competitions, losing one final and finishing runners-up in the league stage twice more. After the 2020 and 2021 season were cancelled due to the COVID-19 pandemic, Jamaica won the 2022 Twenty20 Blaze, edging out Barbados on Net Run Rate. They reached the final of the 2022 Women's Super50 Cup, but lost to Barbados.

Players

Current squad
Based on squad announced for the 2022 season. Players in bold have international caps.

Notable players
Players who have played for Jamaica and played internationally are listed below, in order of first international appearance (given in brackets). Players listed with a Jamaica flag appeared for the side at the 1973 World Cup, which carried One Day International status:

 Paulette Lynch (1973)
 Evelyn Bogle (1973)
 Dorrett Davis (1973)
 Elaine Emmanual (1973)
 Peggy Fairweather (1973)
 Yolande Geddes-Hall (1973)
 Dorothy Hobson (1973)
 Vivalyn Latty-Scott (1973)
 Loretta McIntosh (1973)
 Yvonne Oldfield (1973)
 Madge Stewart (1973)
 Grace Williams (1973)
 Audrey McInnis (1973)
 Hyacinth Fleming (1973)
 Marlene Needham (1993)
 Jacqueline Robinson (1993)
 Rita Scott (1993)
 Jennifer Sterling (1993)
 Elaine Cunningham (1993)
 Lorna McKoy (1997)
 Chedean Nation (2008)
 Stafanie Taylor (2008)
 Shanel Daley (2008)
 Natasha McLean (2012)
 Chinelle Henry (2013)
 Vanessa Watts (2014)
 Rashada Williams (2021)

Honours
 Women's Super50 Cup:
 Winners (5): 1977, 1999, 2011, 2013, 2014
 Twenty20 Blaze:
 Winners (3): 2012, 2013, 2022

Records

One-Day Internationals
Highest team total: 162/8 vs International XI, 14 July 1973.
Highest individual score: 61, Vivalyn Latty-Scott vs Young England, 30 June 1973.
Best innings bowling: 4/9, Madge Stewart vs Young England, 30 June 1973.

See also
 List of Jamaica women ODI cricketers
 Jamaica national cricket team

Notes

References

Cricket
Women's national cricket teams
Women
Women's cricket in Jamaica
Women's cricket teams in the West Indies
1973 Women's Cricket World Cup
1973 establishments in Jamaica